Anthony Duane McHenry (born April 16, 1983) is an American professional basketball player who plays for Japan's B.League side Shinshu Brave Warriors.

The 6 ft 8 in (201 cm) forward who was born in Birmingham, Alabama and graduated from Georgia Tech in August 2008, previously played for Leicester Riders in the British Basketball League (2005–2006) and the Fort Worth Flyers in the NBA Development League before signing for the Ryukyu Golden Kings in 2008. He took a Graduate assistant job at his alma mater, Georgia Tech in the 2007-08 season.

Career statistics

Regular season 

|-
| align="left" | 2008-09
| align="left" | Ryukyu
| 49 || 49 || 36.3 || .450 || .336 || .562 || 8.3 || 4.7 || 1.5 || 1.7 || 3.0 || 15.5
|-
| align="left" |  2009-10
| align="left" | Ryukyu
| 49 || 49 || 36.0 || .416 || .245 || .560 || 6.7 || 5.0 || 1.5 || 1.4 || 2.6 || 12.4
|-
| align="left" |  2010-11
| align="left" | Ryukyu
| 50 || 45 || 26.1 || .480 || .361 || .721 || 6.4 || 3.1 || 1.3 || 1.0 || 2.0 || 11.1
|-
| align="left" |  2011-12
| align="left" | Ryukyu
| 52 || 51 || 30.1 || .465 || .362 || .706 || 7.3 || 2.8 || 0.9 || 1.2 || 2.1 || 11.9
|-
| align="left" | 2012-13
| align="left" | Ryukyu
| 50 || 50 || 32.4 || .534 || .374 || .760 || 9.7 || 3.1 || 2.0 || 1.1 || 1.9 || 16.1 
|-
| align="left" |  2013-14
| align="left" | Ryukyu
| 48 || 47 || 29.4 || .486 || .302 || .641 || 7.4 || 3.2 || 1.7 || 1.3 || 1.9 || 13.3 
|-
| align="left" |  2014-15
| align="left" | Ryukyu
| 51||  || 29.5|| .478|| .344|| .766|| 7.4|| 3.3|| 1.3|| 1.0|| 2.1|| 12.4
|-
| align="left" |  2015-16
| align="left" | Ryukyu
| 50|| || 29.1|| .548|| .318|| .661|| 8.7|| 3.6|| 1.3|| 1.4|| 2.0|| 10.3
|-
| align="left" |  2016-17
| align="left" | Ryukyu
| || || || || || || || || || || ||
|-
| align="left" |  2017-18
| align="left" | Shinshu
| || || || || || || || || || || ||
|-

External links
Georgia Tech Profile

 Ryukyu Golden Kings-Anthony McHenry- 

1983 births
Living people
American expatriate basketball people in Japan
American expatriate basketball people in the United Kingdom
American men's basketball players
Basketball players from Birmingham, Alabama
British Basketball League players
Fort Worth Flyers players
Georgia Tech Yellow Jackets men's basketball players
Leicester Riders players
Ryukyu Golden Kings players
Shinshu Brave Warriors players
Small forwards
American expatriate sportspeople in England